is a railway station on the Hakone Tozan Line located in Hakone, Kanagawa Prefecture, Japan. It is 12.1 rail kilometers from the line's terminus at Odawara Station.

History
Miyanoshita Station was opened on June 1, 1919.

Lines
Hakone Tozan Railway
Hakone Tozan Line

Building
Miyanoshita Station has two opposed side platforms.

Platforms

Bus services
 Hakone Tozan Bus
"H" line for Hakone Machi Ko (Lake Ashi) via Kowakidani Station, Kowaki-en, Moto Hakone Ko (Hakone Shrine: Transfer for Sightseeing Cruise), Hakone Checkpoint
"T" line for Togendai (Lake Ashi: Transfer for Sightseeing Cruise) via  Venetian Glass Museum, Sengoku (Transfer for Gotemba Premium Outlets and JR Gotemba Station; a gateway station for Mount Fuji and Fuji Five Lakes, including Lake Kawaguchi and Lake Yamanaka), Kawamukai (The Little Prince and Saint-Exupéry Museum), Senkyoro-mae (Transfer for Pola Museum of Art), Sengoku-kogen (Pampas grass viewing spot)
"H" & "T" line For Ohiradai Station, Hakone Yumoto Station and Odawara Station
 Izu Hakone Bus
"J" line for Kojiri via Kowakidani Station, Kowaki-en, Ōwakudani
"Z" line for Hakone Checkpoint via Kowakidani Station, Kowaki-en, Moto Hakone (Hakone Shrine)
"J" & "Z" line for Ohiradai Station, Hakone Yumoto Station and Odawara Station

References

External links
 Hakone Tozan Railway Official Site
 Hakone Tozan Bus Official Site

Railway stations in Japan opened in 1919
Stations of Hakone Tozan Railway
Railway stations in Kanagawa Prefecture
Buildings and structures in Hakone, Kanagawa